The Malayan pygmy shrew (Suncus malayanus) is a species of mammal in the family Soricidae. It can be found in Malaysia and Thailand. Its natural habitat is subtropical or tropical dry forests.

References

Sources

Suncus
Mammals of Malaysia
Mammals of Thailand
Taxonomy articles created by Polbot
Mammals described in 1917